This is a list of museums in New Zealand, including regional museums, local museums, art galleries and maritime museums.

See also

 New Zealand Fashion Museum
 List of New Zealand railway museums and heritage lines
 Tourism in New Zealand
 Culture of New Zealand

References

External links
 NZMuseums website, National Services Te Paerangi

 

New Zealand education-related lists